is a 1965 Japanese film starring Rentarō Mikuni and Ken Takakura and directed by Tomu Uchida. It is a detective story based on the novel Kiga Kaikyo (1962) by Tsutomu Minakami. The film is also known as "Straits of Hunger" or "Hunger Straits" (the literal translation of the original Japanese title) in English.

Plot
Three robbers escape with loot from a heist, but during the escape, two of them are killed by the other one. Their dead bodies wash up on the shore after a maritime disaster, but a policeman, Yumisaka (Junzaburō Ban), becomes suspicious because they are not listed as passengers. The surviving robber Inukai (Rentaro Mikuni) is sheltered by a prostitute, Yae (Sachiko Hidari). In return, the robber gives her a large sum of money, and she is able to start a new life. The policeman follows Yae to Tokyo on the trail of the robber, but she refuses to cooperate with him.

Many years later, Yae sees the man who had given her the money in a newspaper article. She tries to thank him, but because he has now become a respectable citizen, living under the name Tarumi, he kills her so that his secret is not known. Yumisaka, who was forced to resign from the police force because of his obsession with this case, and a young detective (Ken Takakura) pursue the clue they need to bring him to justice.

Finally, as Inukai is being transported on a ferry back to face charges, he commits suicide by jumping from the boat.

Cast 
 Rentarō Mikuni - Takichi Inukai aka Kyōichirō Tarumi
 Sachiko Hidari - Yae Sugito
 Ken Takakura - Detective Ajimura
 Junzaburō Ban - Former detective Yumisaka
 Kōji Mitsui - Motojima
 Yoshi Katō - Yae's Father
 Sadako Sawamura - Motojima's Wife
 Susumu Fujita - Police Chief
 Nobuo Yana - Machida
 Rinichi Yamamoto -  Monk
 Akiko Kazami - Toshiko

Reception
It was voted the sixth greatest Japanese film ever made by Kinema Jumpo in 1995, and the third greatest Japanese film in the same magazine in 1999.

References

External links

1965 films
1960s Japanese-language films
Japanese black-and-white films
1960s Japanese films